Hesarak or Hisarak (Pashto: حصارک,|Dari) ولسوالی حصارک is a district in the west of Nangarhar Province, Afghanistan. Its population was estimated at 28,462 in 2002. The district centre is the village of Hesarak.

References

 UNHCR District Profile, dated 2002-07-02, accessed 2006-07-14 (PDF).

External links
 Map of Hisarak (PDF)

Districts of Nangarhar Province